Sir Thomas Hayes (died 27 September 1617) was an English merchant who was Lord Mayor of London in 1614.

Hayes was a city of London merchant and a member of the Worshipful Company of Drapers. On 22 December 1603 he was elected an alderman of the City of London for Bishopsgate ward. He was knighted on 26 July 1603. He was Sheriff of London for the years 1604 to 1605. In 1613 he was elected alderman for Cornhill ward. In 1614, he was elected Lord Mayor of London.
 
Hayes married a daughter of Robert Howse who was  Sheriff of London from 1586 to 1587. His daughter married Sir Henry Boothby, 1st Baronet. Another daughter Margaret married Peter Egerton, younger son of Sir John Egerton.

References

Year of birth missing
1617 deaths
English merchants
Sheriffs of the City of London
17th-century lord mayors of London